Boyne Castle (also known as the Palace of Boyne) is a 16th-century quadrangular castle about  east of Portsoy, Aberdeenshire, Scotland,  south of Boyne Bay.

History
Around 1320 the land was owned by Thomas Randolph, 1st Earl of Moray, but passed first to the Edmonstone family and then, by marriage, to the Ogilvies. Sir George Ogilvy of Dunlugas built the castle in the late 16th century. Occupation continued until after 1723.

Charles McKean suggested that building was slightly earlier, constructed by Alexander Ogilvy of Boyne before 1575 for his bride, Mary Beaton, a companion of Mary, Queen of Scots, brought up at the French royal court.

James VI of Scotland stayed at the castle in July 1589. His ambassadors Andrew Keith, Lord Dingwall, George Young, and John Skene brought him news from Denmark of the progress of his marriage negotiations and preparations of ships, jewels, and a silver coach for Anne of Denmark.

Structure

It has been said that Boyne Castle “was once a splendid place with fine rooms, above vaulted basements, and had large windows”. The remains are overgrown and ruinous,

There is a twin-turreted gatehouse to the south. Entrance is by a causeway, which is raised and walled. There are remains of two walled gardens.

The castle ruin is a Scheduled Ancient Monument.

References

Castles in Aberdeenshire
Scheduled Ancient Monuments in Aberdeenshire
Buildings and structures in Portsoy